Rock & Roll Divorce is the second live album by the Finnish rock band Hanoi Rocks, released in 1985. It was recorded at the last concert before they split in May 1985 at the Rock Arena Festival in Poland. It is widely regarded as the sound of a great band falling apart. This is also the only Hanoi Rocks album to feature René Berg on bass and Terry Chimes on drums. Michael Monroe was going to leave the band before this album was released, but agreed to do a small tour in Poland, on the condition that a live record wouldn't be released. Rock & Roll Divorce was a half-official release. According to Hanoi Rocks' autobiography, the album was the last date of the Polish-tour recorded by Mick Staplehurst. Which isn't quite correct, it was actually taken from several shows but mainly from Gdansk and for that reason it should have been called 'The Solidarity Tapes'. It was originally put together for the amusement of band members only! Hanoi Rocks' former manager Seppo Vesterinen, has stated that: "Rock & Roll Divorce was an awful record that should have never been released."

Track listing

Personnel
Hanoi Rocks
Michael Monroe – vocals
Andy McCoy – guitars
Nasty Suicide – guitars
René Berg – bass
Terry Chimes – drums

Chart positions

Album

References

Hanoi Rocks albums
1985 live albums